Rolin is a surname. Notable people with the surname include:

Gustave Rolin-Jaequemyns (1835–1902), Belgian attorney at law, diplomat and Minister of the Interior
Jean Rolin (writer) (born 1949), French writer and journalist
Jean Rolin (cardinal) (1408–1483), Burgundian bishop and Cardinal
Nicolas Rolin (1376–1462), leading figure in the history of Burgundy and France, becoming chancellor to Philip the Good
Olivier Rolin (born 1947), French writer
Rolin Jones (born 1972), playwright and television writer

See also
Madonna of Chancellor Rolin, oil painting by the Early Netherlandish master Jan van Eyck, dating from around 1435
Musée Rolin, museum in Autun, Bourgogne, France
Roll-in
Rollin (disambiguation)
Rolling
Rowling (disambiguation)